Bandwidth is a communications platform as a service company.  They sell software application programming interfaces (or APIs) for voice and messaging, using their own IP voice network.

History
Bandwidth was formed in 1999 by David Morken who was later joined by Henry Kaestner as co-founder in 2001, merging Bandwidth International into Bandwidth.com. Bandwidth moved to Centennial Campus of North Carolina State University in Raleigh, North Carolina in 2012. Bandwidth announced in 2020 a plan to move its corporate headquarters to 2021 Edwards Mill Road in Raleigh. The proposed campus is slated to include two five-story buildings, covering 450,000 square feet, and later an additional 350,000 square foot phase. Bandwidth also stated an intent to hire for some 1,000 new positions at the time of the announcement.

As of December 31, 2018, Bandwidth maintains a workforce of 700+ employees.

On November 10, 2017, the company had an initial public offering on the NASDAQ which raised $80 million in capital by selling 4 million $20 shares.

Acquisitions
On October 12, 2020, Bandwidth announced it had signed a definitive agreement to acquire Voxbone for an enterprise value of €446 million EUR.

Partnership
In August 2020, Bandwidth announced it had partnered with NC State University for a study that which ran from February 2019 to January 2020 to study fraudulent traffic patterns associated with robocalling.

See also
Unified communications 
Voxbone

References

External links

Cloud communication platforms
Software companies of the United States
VoIP companies of the United States
Companies listed on the Nasdaq
2017 initial public offerings
Companies based in Raleigh, North Carolina
Publicly traded companies of the United States
Technology companies of the United States
1999 establishments in North Carolina
Information technology companies of the United States
American companies established in 1999
Software companies based in North Carolina
Software companies established in 1999